"Stomp" is a song by British pop group Steps, released as a single on 16 October 2000. The song features a modified orchestral riff from "Everybody Dance", released by Chic in 1978, but Bernard Edwards and Nile Rodgers did not receive songwriting credits until the release of Gold: Greatest Hits in 2001. "Stomp" was the group's second and final single to hit number one on the UK Singles Chart. The track was later released in Australia, Japan, and Europe.

Music video
The video was filmed in Chiswick and features group members Lisa Scott-Lee and Ian "H" Watkins looking after a penthouse apartment while the owner Bill (Dave Legeno) is away on business. They, and the other group members, then throw a party for all their friends but struggle to tidy up before the owner returns.

Track listings

UK CD single
 "Stomp" – 3:22
 "Stomp" (W.I.P. mix) – 6:08
 "Tragedy" (W.I.P. Reception mix) – 6:57

UK cassette single
 "Stomp" – 3:22
 "Tragedy" (W.I.P. Reception mix) – 6:57

European CD single
 "Stomp" – 3:22
 "Stomp" (W.I.P. mix) – 6:08

Australian and New Zealand CD single
 "Stomp" – 3:22
 "Stomp" (W.I.P. mix) – 6:08
 "Stomp" (Stomp'n mix) – 5:33
 "Tragedy" (W.I.P. Reception mix) – 6:57

Japanese CD single
 "Stomp" (album version) – 3:20
 "Stomp" (W.I.P. mix) – 6:08
 "Tragedy" (W.I.P. Reception mix) – 6:57
 "Stomp" (Dance☆Man's Cosmic Funk mix) – 4:29

Credits and personnel
Credits are adapted from the booklet of Buzz.

Recording
 Recorded at PWL Studios, Manchester, in 2000
 Mixed at PWL Studios, Manchester
 Mastered at Transfermation Studios, London

Vocals
 Lead vocals – Claire Richards, Faye Tozer, Lisa Scott-Lee, Ian "H" Watkins
 Background vocals –  Lee Latchford-Evans

Personnel
 Songwriting – Mark Topham, Karl Twigg, Rita Campbell
 Production – Mark Topham, Karl Twigg, Pete Waterman
 Mixing – Tim Speight
 Engineer – Tim Speight
 Assistant Engineers – Roe and Dan
 Keyboards – Karl Twigg
 Guitar – Greg Bone
 Bass – Ernie McCone, Mark Topham

Charts

Weekly charts

Year-end charts

Certifications

See also
 List of UK Singles Chart number ones of the 2000s

References

2000 singles
2000 songs
Jive Records singles
Number-one singles in Scotland
Pete Waterman Entertainment singles
Songs written by Karl Twigg
Songs written by Mark Topham
Steps (group) songs
UK Singles Chart number-one singles